Vittorio Stagni (born December 17, 1937) is an Italian actor and voice actor.

Biography
Born in Milan to a theatre administrator, Stagni began his dubbing career at a young age. One of his earliest roles was in Dumbo in which he provided the Italian voice of Skinny. His career intensified as he grew older. He is the official Italian voice of Rick Moranis, Wallace Shawn and he also dubbed Warwick Davis in the Italian version of the Harry Potter film franchise. He is also renowned for dubbing Kif Kroker in the Italian-Language version of Futurama.

Stagni's role as an actor on screen mainly occurred in the 1970s and he also had another acting role as a teenager in 1973.

Personal life
Stagni's daughter is professional voice actress Ilaria Stagni, who was the original Italian voice of Bart Simpson until 2012. He was previously married to voice actress Lorenza Biella.

Filmography
Good Folk's Sunday (1953)
Commissariato di notturna (1974)
Hit Squad (1976)
La compagna di banco (1977)
The House of Chicken (2001)

References

External links

1938 births
Living people
Italian male voice actors
Italian male television actors
Italian male film actors
Italian male stage actors
Italian male child actors
Italian voice directors
Male actors from Milan